Curticella approximans is a species of tephritid or fruit flies in the genus Curticella of the family Tephritidae.

Distribution
Indonesia, Papua New Guinea, Bismarck Archipelago.

References

Tephritinae
Diptera of Asia
Insects described in 1860